Lithuania participated in the Eurovision Song Contest 2006 with the song "We Are the Winners" written by Andrius Mamontovas, Saulius Urbonavičius and Viktoras Diawara. The song was performed by the group LT United. Songwriter and group member Viktoras Diawara previously represented Lithuania in the 2001 contest as part of the group SKAMP, placing 13th with the song "You Got Style". The Lithuanian broadcaster Lithuanian National Radio and Television (LRT) organised the national final "Eurovizijos" dainų konkurso nacionalinė atranka (Eurovision Song Contest national selection) in order to select the Lithuanian entry for the 2006 contest in Athens, Greece. The national final took place over eight weeks and involved 49 artists competing in two different competitive streams: newcomers and established artists. In the final, 16 entries remained and a public vote entirely selected "We Are the Winners" performed by LT United as the winner with 32,669 votes.

Lithuania competed in the semi-final of the Eurovision Song Contest which took place on 18 May 2006. Performing during the show in position 18, "We Are the Winners" was announced among the top 10 entries of the semi-final and therefore qualified to compete in the final on 20 May. This marked the first qualification to the final for Lithuania since the introduction of semi-finals in 2004. It was later revealed that Finland placed fifth out of the 23 participating countries in the semi-final with 163 points. In the final, Lithuania performed in position 14 and placed sixth out of the 24 participating countries, scoring 162 points.

Background 

Prior to the 2006 contest, Lithuania had participated in the Eurovision Song Contest six times since its first entry in 1994. The nation’s best placing in the contest was 13th, which it achieved in 2001 with the song "You Got Style" performed by Skamp. In the 2005 contest, "Little by Little" performed by Laura and the Lovers failed to qualify to the final.
 
For the 2006 contest, the Lithuanian national broadcaster, Lithuanian National Radio and Television (LRT), broadcast the event within Lithuania and organised the selection process for the nation's entry. Other than the internal selection of their debut entry in 1994, Lithuania has selected their entry consistently through a national final procedure. LRT confirmed their intentions to participate at the 2006 Eurovision Song Contest on 5 October 2005 and announced the organization of "Eurovizijos" dainų konkurso nacionalinė atranka, which would be the national final to select Lithuania's entry for Athens.

Before Eurovision

"Eurovizijos" dainų konkurso nacionalinė atranka 
"Eurovizijos" dainų konkurso nacionalinė atranka (Eurovision Song Contest national selection) was the national final format developed by LRT in order to select Lithuania's entry for the Eurovision Song Contest 2006. The competition involved an eight-week-long process that commenced on 14 January 2006 and concluded with a winning song and artist on 4 March 2006. The eight shows took place were hosted by Jurga Šeduikytė and Rolandas Vilkončius and were broadcast on LTV and LTV2 as well as online via the broadcaster's website lrt.lt.

Format 
The Lithuanian broadcaster overhauled the format of the national final from that of previous years. For the 2006 competition, entries initially competed in two different subgroups: newcomers and established artists with more than one year of active stage experience or that had participated in the Lithuanian national final for at least two years. Entries from newcomers were higher in number (28) and therefore three heats consisting of eight or 10 entries each were held during the programme Lietuvos dainų dešimtukas resulting in the top four that advanced in the competition from each show. The remaining 12 entries participated in the fourth show on 4 February where half of the entries were eliminated, leaving six entries remaining in the group. The fifth to seventh shows were the competition's semi-finals where the established artists and the remaining six newcomers participated together for the first time. Nine entries participated in each of the first two semi-finals and the top five proceeded to the final, while seven entries participated in the third semi-final and the top four proceeded to the final. LRT also selected two wildcard acts for the final out of the remaining non-qualifying acts from the semi-finals. In the final, the winner was selected from the remaining 16 entries.

The results of the newcomers selection were determined by the 50/50 combination of votes from a jury panel consisting of three to five members and public televoting. The ranking developed by both streams of voting was converted to points from 1-8, 10 and 12 and assigned based on the number of competing songs in the respective show. In the semi-finals and the final, the results were determined solely by public televoting. The public could vote through telephone and SMS voting.

Competing entries 
LRT opened a submission period on 5 October 2005 for artists and songwriters to submit their entries with the deadline on 11 December 2005. On 13 January 2005, LRT announced the 52 entries selected for the competition from 72 submissions received. Among the artists was previous Lithuanian Eurovision contestant Viktoras Diawara (member of LT United), who represented Lithuania in 2001 as part of Skamp. The final changes to the list of 52 competing acts were later made with the withdrawal of three songs: "Daydreaming" performed by Eleonora Sobrova from the newcomers group, and "Day or Night" performed by Amberlife and "Escape We Tonight" performed by Mantas from the established artists group.

Shows

Newcomers selection 
The newcomers selection of the competition aired from the LRT studios in Vilnius between 14 January and 4 February 2006. The three semi-finals featured the 28 entries from the newcomers and the top four advanced to the newcomers final from each semi-final; the bottom entries were eliminated. The members of the jury in the first semi-final consisted of Vytautas Juozapavičius (producer), Povilas Meškėla (lead singer of the group Rojaus tūzai) and Rima Dirsytė-Zeip (singer), while the jury in the second semi-final consisted of Janina Miščiukaitė (singer), Jurijus Smoriginas (choreographer) and Artūras Orlauskas (television presenter), and the jury in the third semi-final consisted of Arina Borunova (singer), Viktoras Malinauskas (singer), Edmundas Žalpys (music event organiser) and Arminas Višinskis (journalist). In the newcomers final which featured the remaining 12 entries that qualified from the semi-finals, the top six entries advanced to the national final, while the bottom six were eliminated. The members of the jury in the newcomers final consisted of Stepas Januška (singer), Algirdas Kaušpėdas (lead singer of the group Antis), Vilhelmas Čepinskis (musician), Jonas Jučas (organiser of the Kaunas Jazz festival) and Artūras Orlauskas.

Semi-finals 
The three semi-finals of the competition aired from the LRT studios in Vilnius on 11, 18 and 25 February 2006 and featured both the established artists and entries that qualified from the newcomers selection. In each of the first two semi-finals the top five advanced to the final, while the top four entries of the third semi-final advanced to the final; the bottom entries were eliminated. On 27 February 2006, LRT announced the two entries that had received a wildcard to also proceed to the final.

Final 
The final of the competition took place on 4 March 2006 at the Siemens Arena in Vilnius and featured the remaining 16 entries that qualified from the semi-finals. The final was the only show in the competition to be broadcast live; all other preceding shows were pre-recorded earlier in the week before their airdates. "We Are the Winners" performed by LT United was selected as the winner after gaining the most votes from the public. In addition to the performances of the competing entries, No Money, Žuvėdra and 2005 Moldovan Eurovision entrants Zdob și Zdub performed as the interval acts.

At Eurovision
According to Eurovision rules, all nations with the exceptions of the host country, the "Big Four" (France, Germany, Spain and the United Kingdom) and the 10 highest placed finishers in the 2005 contest are required to qualify from the semi-final on 18 May 2006 in order to compete for the final on 20 May 2006; the top 10 countries from the semi-final progress to the final. On 21 March 2006, an allocation draw was held which determined the running order for the semi-final and Lithuania was set to perform in position 18, following the entry from the Netherlands and before the entry from Portugal. At the end of the show, Lithuania was announced as having finished in the top 10 and subsequently qualifying for the grand final. This marked the first qualification to the final for Lithuania since the introduction of semi-finals in 2004. It was later revealed that Lithuania placed fifth in the semi-final, receiving a total of 163 points. The draw for the running order for the final was done by the presenters during the announcement of the 10 qualifying countries during the semi-final and Lithuania was drawn to perform in position 14, following the entry from Bosnia and Herzegovina and before the entry from the United Kingdom. Lithuania placed sixth in the final, scoring 162 points. Despite acheiving the nation's best result to date, the entry received mixed reactions and was one of the few Eurovision songs to get booed at the contest.

The semi-final and final were broadcast in Lithuania on LTV with commentary by Darius Užkuraitis. The Lithuanian spokesperson, who announced the Lithuanian votes during the final, was Lavija Šurnaitė.

Voting 
Below is a breakdown of points awarded to Lithuania and awarded by Lithuania in the semi-final and grand final of the contest. The nation awarded its 12 points to Russia in the semi-final and the final of the contest.

Points awarded to Lithuania

Points awarded by Lithuania

References

2006
Countries in the Eurovision Song Contest 2006
Eurovision